Events in the year 2006 in Bulgaria.

Incumbents 

 President: Georgi Parvanov
 Prime Minister: Sergei Stanishev

Events 

 22 October – Presidential elections were held in Bulgaria.

Deaths
December 7 - Lyuben Berov, prime minister (1992-1994)

References 

 
2000s in Bulgaria
Years of the 21st century in Bulgaria
Bulgaria
Bulgaria